YSJ may refer to:
 York St John University
 Saint John Airport (IATA airport code)
 Yoo Seung-jun (born 1976), South Korean singer